Vincent Olla (born 4 February 1973) is a French sprint canoeist who competed in the mid-1990s. At the 1996 Summer Olympics in Atlanta, he was eliminated in the semifinals of the K-1 1000 m event.
He was director of the French canoe sprint teams from 2012 to 2016.

References
Sports-Reference.com profile

1972 births
Canoeists at the 1996 Summer Olympics
French male canoeists
Living people
Olympic canoeists of France
Place of birth missing (living people)